The Last Home Run is a 1996 film directed by Bob Gosse.

It tells the story of Jonathan Lyle, an elderly man in a nursing home (played by Seymour Cassel) who is transformed by a mystic, for five days, into a 12-year-old boy (played by Thomas Guiry) playing Little League Baseball.

The Last Home Run also starred Jordi Vilasuso and Vinnette Justine Carroll (in her last film appearance), and included cameos by former Major League Baseball players Gary Carter and Dave Winfield.

It was based on a story by Roger Flax who wrote the screenplay along with Ed Apfel.

The independent film was produced in 1995, and was released direct-to-video on March 23, 1996.

The movie marked the only film appearance by the real Marley, the Labrador Retriever that was the central character of the best-selling 2005 book Marley & Me and the 2008 film of the same name.  Author John Grogan devoted Chapter 16, "The Audition", to the dog's escapades during filming at a Lake Worth, Florida, hotel parking lot. Marley got a screen credit "Marley the Dog...As Himself" for his two minutes of screen time.

References

1996 films
1990s sports drama films
1990s English-language films
Films directed by Bob Gosse
Films about dogs
Films set in Florida
American baseball films
American sports drama films
1996 drama films
1990s American films